The Dodge Charger is a full-size four-door sedan, introduced first at the 2005 North American International Auto Show and built by American automobile manufacturer Stellantis North America, a subsidiary of Stellantis. It is available in rear-wheel drive or all-wheel drive drivetrains. The Charger was developed to continue the Dodge Charger line with its muscle car heritage, and replaced the Dodge Intrepid as Dodge's full-size sedan. The seventh-generation Charger debuted for the 2011 model year.

History
The first Charger was a 1964 show car based on the Dodge Polara and fitted with a 426 Wedge V8 engine. The first production Charger, based on the Dodge Coronet, was introduced as a 1966 model. There were several different vehicles bearing the Charger nameplate built on three different platforms and sizes, all bearing the Charger nameplate. Although the name is associated with the late-1960s performance model in the Dodge range, it was also used on personal luxury coupes during the late-1970s and on front-wheel-drive subcompact hatchbacks during the 1980s.

In 1999, Dodge introduced a new Charger R/T concept car. It was also  lighter. It featured a four-door sedan body design, whereas all the previous production Chargers had two doors.

It was a return to a rear-wheel-drive sedan platform Dodge had not offered since the mid-size Dodge Diplomat had been discontinued in 1989.

In November 2021, Stellantis announced that 2023 model year would be the final model year for both the Dodge Charger and Dodge Challenger, as the company will focus its future plans on electric vehicles rather than fossil fuel powered vehicles, especially with tougher automotive emissions standards of being rolled out and required by the Environmental Protection Agency for the 2023 model year.They also say the new Charger SRT Daytona will be coming in 2024, likely to replace the current Charger and Challenger

Sixth generation LX (2006–2010)

The Dodge Charger is based on the rear-wheel-drive Chrysler LX platform with Chrysler executives confirming that structural elements of the car's foundation such as the toe board, safety cage architecture, as well as the load-path philosophy being utilized by then-partner, Mercedes-Benz. Mercedes executives also confirmed that several individual components of the car are derived from the Mercedes-Benz E-Class (W211) and S-Class of the era. Shared and or derived components from Mercedes-Benz included: the rear suspension cradle and 5-link independent rear suspension design derived from E-Class, a double-wishbone front suspension design with short-and-long arm front suspension geometry derived from the Mercedes-Benz S-Class (W220), the 5-Speed NAG1 W5A580 transmission, rear differential, driveshaft, ESP & ABS systems, steering system, the CAN Bus electrical architecture, cabin electronics including several other electronic modules, switchgear such as the cruise control and turn signal combination stalk, seat controls, seat frames, and the wiring harness. Later models also feature a Mercedes-Benz-derived laser key ignition system in place of the traditional metal key. AWD models also benefited from the use of Mercedes-Benz's 4MATIC system, including transfer case components.

Both the SXT and R/T models were available in rear and all-wheel drive trains starting in 2007. The AWD system is engaged all the time, routing approximately 60% of the power to the rear wheels and 40% of the power to the front wheels.

After three years of production, an update for 2009 models was made. This sixth generation included relocating the rear decklid's "CHARGER" badging from the left to the right, making way for "DODGE" at the left. Tail lamps were also revised. 2008 models had seen minor revisions to the interior (a new center console and switchgear changes). The 2009 Charger AWD utilized the BorgWarner Torque-on-Demand system which disconnects the front axles until extra traction is needed. This results in a slight boost in fuel economy while retaining the same maximum power split to the front wheels.

Trim Levels

The Dodge Charger was available in several trim levels:

The unnamed Base model was the entry-level model in the Charger lineup. Powered by the 2.7L "Magnum" V6 gasoline engine (starting with 2008 models) or a 3.5L "Magnum" V6 gasoline engine (for 2006 and 2007 models), mated to a four- or five-speed automatic transmission (06-07 models with 3.5L engines used the 5-speed regardless of drive type, while 2.7L cars were RWD only and used the 4-speed exclusively), the Base was equipped with features such as seventeen-inch black steel wheels with full plastic wheel covers, an A/M-F/M stereo radio with a single-disc CD player (with MP3 capabilities starting in 2008) and an auxiliary audio input jack, a four-speaker audio system, a urethane steering wheel, power brakes, a color-keyed front grille with black inserts, cloth seating surfaces, power windows and door locks, remote keyless entry, air conditioning, color-keyed exterior door handles, power-adjustable exterior side mirrors with black caps, a compact spare tire and wheel, and a split-folding rear bench seat, among other features. Options, while limited, included four-wheel Antilock Braking System (ABS) brakes, SiriusXM Satellite Radio, a six-speaker audio system, and a cruise control. This model was only available with rear-wheel drive. 

The SE Plus model was only offered for the 2008 model year and added features onto the unnamed Base trim. These added features included SiriusXM Satellite Radio, a six-speaker audio system, the 3.5 L "Magnum" V6 gasoline engine, a cruise control, four-wheel power Antilock Braking System (ABS) brakes, and seventeen-inch aluminum-alloy wheels. This model was only available with rear-wheel drive.

The SXT was the volume seller of the Charger lineup. Originally available as an appearance package for the unnamed Base model until 2007, the SXT became its own trim level starting with the 2008 model year. Features added onto to the Base trim included a chrome front grille with black inserts, SiriusXM Satellite Radio (starting with 2008 models), a six-speaker audio system, steering wheel-mounted audio system controls, a security alarm system, a leather-wrapped steering wheel and automatic transmission shift lever, a cruise control, four-wheel power Antilock Braking System (ABS) brakes, a power-adjustable front driver's bucket seat, and the 3.5L "Magnum" V6 gasoline engine (starting with 2008 models). Options on the SXT included eighteen-inch tires and aluminum-alloy wheels, an A/M-F/M stereo radio with a six-disc, in-dash CD/MP3 changer (including DVD and DVD Audio playback starting in 2008), a touchscreen infotainment system (starting with 2008 models), a U Connect hands-free Bluetooth phone system, two different Boston Acoustics audio systems (one with a subwoofer), Digital Sound Processing (DSP), and an external amplifier, a GPS navigation system, a rearview backup camera system, a remote vehicle starter system, luxury leather-trimmed seating surfaces, dual power-adjustable front bucket seats, a five-speed automatic transmission, and a power sunroof. This model was available with either rear-wheel drive or All Wheel Drive (AWD).

The R/T was the performance-oriented Charger model. It added features onto the SXT trim such as the 5.7 L HEMI V8 gasoline engine with the Multi-Displacement System (MDS), a five-speed automatic transmission, a six-speaker Boston Acoustics premium audio system with a 276-watt external amplifier and Digital Sound Processing (DSP), SiriusXM Satellite Radio (starting with 2008 models), eighteen-inch tires and polished aluminum-alloy wheels, exterior body side moldings, luxury leather-trimmed seating surfaces, dual power-adjustable front bucket seats, power-adjustable and heated exterior side mirrors with color-keyed caps, a dual-zone automatic climate control system, a rear spoiler, and front fog lamps. Most options available on the SXT trim were also available on the R/T trim. This model was available with either rear-wheel drive (RWD) or All Wheel Drive (AWD). A Road/Track Performance Group was available on RWD cars, which added 4-10 bhp, depending on year (achieved with a less restrictive air intake tract and exhaust), a different steering rack (referred to as a '9-land' steering gear in contemporary marketing materials), a stiffer suspension, subtly different wheels with black accents (2006 only, 2007-10 models had 20-inch wheels included with the package) shod with performance tires, 'Heritage' R/T badging, and different seats with more aggressive bolstering (shared with the SRT8); 2007-10 models also included a front chin spoiler and rear wing spoiler. Unlike the Daytona R/T (which included all of the package's contents and added an even less restrictive muffler and special colors, badging, and striping), there was no production limit.

The SRT-8 was the top trim level of the Charger lineup. It added features onto the R/T trim such as the 6.1L HEMI V8 gasoline engine without the Multi-Displacement System (MDS), Brembo performance front and rear brakes with painted brake calipers, sport front bucket seats, dual heated front bucket seats, an AM-FM stereo radio with an in-dash, six-disc CD/MP3 changer (including DVD and DVD Audio playback starting with 2008 models), SiriusXM Satellite Radio (starting with 2008 models), sport leather-trimmed seating surfaces with perforated microfiber suede inserts, a color-keyed front grille with black "Honeycomb" inserts, a performance body kit, twenty-inch performance-rated tires, and forged aluminum-alloy wheels, electronic stability and traction controls, and simulated carbon-fiber interior trim. Optional features included touchscreen infotainment system (starring with 2008 models), SiriusXM satellite Radio (for 2006 and 2007 models), a navigation system, U Connect hands-free Bluetooth phone system, and a 13-speaker Kicker audio system with a powered amplifier, Digital Sound Processing (DSP), and a rear trunk-mounted subwoofer. This model was only available with rear-wheel drive.

Engines

In 2006, the 2.7 L V6 was also available in the U.S. for fleet sales only. For 2007, the SE package could be had with the 2.7 L engine. The Canadian SXT model included the 3.5 L V6.

The R/T version uses the 5.7 L Hemi V8 engine.

Daytona R/T

The 2006 Charger Daytona R/T debuted at the Chicago Auto Show. It featured a high output  version of the  Hemi as well as an updated suspension and tires. Visual additions included a special front fascia with a chin spoiler and a black rear spoiler. In a retro touch, the Daytona R/T featured black "Hemi" decals on the hood and rear fender and retro high impact colors.

The 2006 Dodge Charger R/T Daytona Limited colors were "Go ManGo!" (orange with black decals and spoiler (punctuation in the name is correct, as displayed on the dashboard), "Top Banana" (yellow with black decals and spoiler)), "Tor Red” (red with black decals and spoiler (punctuation in the name is correct, as displayed on the dashboard)). The U.S. production release was limited to 4,000 cars each for orange and yellow, 2,000 for the red, and they had a badge with a production number placed under the far-right dash vent.

In 2007, larger 20-inch chrome-clad wheels were introduced, now being produced only in two new colors, Sub Lime Green and Plum Crazy Purple. In 2008, a revised stripe package was adopted, and the color for this year was HEMI Orange. The color for this year was Stone White. There was no Daytona R/T for the 2010 model year.

SRT-8

An SRT8 version of the Charger debuted at the 2005 New York International Auto Show. Powered by a  version of the  Hemi V8, it also featured upgraded Brembo brakes, and interior and exterior updates. The 425 SAE net horsepower of the modern 6.1 L Hemi makes it more powerful than the Chrysler Hemi engines of the muscle car era, the biggest of which were rated at 425 SAE gross horsepower. This made the 6.1 L Hemi the most powerful V8 engine that Chrysler had put in a production vehicle at the time.

Super Bee

A new Super Bee version of the Charger debuted at the 2006 New York International Auto Show for the 2007 model year. It shared the SRT-8's   Hemi engine, but was available in a special "Detonator Yellow" paint with black decals. It was a limited edition with only 1,000 being produced. A B5 Blue version of the Super Bee was shown at the 2007 North American International Auto Show and went on sale in early 2008, also with a limited run of 1,000. A total of 425 Hemi Orange Super Bees were built in 2009.

DUB Edition

Developed in collaboration with DUB Magazine, this version is based on the Charger SXT. It features a body-color spoiler and fog lamps, 20-inch alloy wheels with 245/45R20 tires, MyGIG Multimedia Infotainment System with 13-speaker Puncher surround-sound system, and a 322w Kicker amplifier, a 100-watt Kicker subwoofer, and upgraded brakes from the R/T models that use dual-piston calipers in the front. Exterior colors are red, black, silver, cool vanilla, and dark titanium.

A total of 2,180 Charger DUB Edition cars were produced for the U.S. market.

Safety
The Insurance Institute for Highway Safety gives the Charger an overall Good score in frontal crash tests. In side impacts Charger models equipped with optional side airbags are given a Marginal score overall, and models without side airbags are given the lowest overall Poor score.

The National Highway Traffic Safety Administration gives the Charger five stars on passenger, driver, and rear passenger crash test ratings and four stars in regard to side-impact rating.

All models come standard with electronic stability program (ESP) (except in 2.7L V6 cars where it is optional) with ABS and all speed traction control.

NASCAR

Racecars based on the Charger were campaigned by several NASCAR Sprint Cup teams starting in 2005 through to 2012. Although NASCAR stock cars bear only a slight resemblance to actual street cars, Dodge's 2005 and 2006 NASCAR entries were based on the Charger silhouette, replacing the previous Dodge Intrepid. Unlike the Intrepid, the Charger shares the rear-wheel-drive with the V8 engine configuration with its NASCAR counterparts.

During the 2007 NASCAR season, the Charger was used in all non Car of Tomorrow races while the Dodge Avenger was used in all Car of Tomorrow races. The Car of Tomorrow was used exclusively in 2008. However, the Avenger Car of Tomorrow was redesignated as a Charger R/T through the use of different decals. The decals have been revised again for 2011–2012 to reflect the updated nose and tail styling of the production Charger, including the full-width taillight panel.

Though the car was successful in Sprint Cup competition, fewer teams were running Dodges from 2007 and on. This would lead Dodge and Ram to abandon its NASCAR (Sprint, Nationwide, and Camping World Truck-series) factory support efforts at the end of the 2012 season. For the 2012 NASCAR season, Penske Racing was the only full-time team campaigning Dodges (the #2 and #22 Chargers) in the Sprint Cup, and their #2 Miller Lite Dodge (driven by Brad Keselowski) won the NASCAR Sprint Cup Championship. Despite winning the Sprint Cup and producing the new 2013 version of the NASCAR Charger, Penske Racing switched to Ford for the 2013 season, ending Dodge's second tenure in the NASCAR Sprint Cup Series.

Seventh generation LD (2011–present)

The 2011 LD Charger seventh generation underwent both exterior and interior changes, taking some styling cues from the 1968–1970 models. A new body featured a redesigned fascia and hood section, modified "racetrack" vintage-style taillights, and a new dashboard. Silver aluminum wheels became standard equipment replacing the previous plastic hubcaps. However, the core foundation of the car was still based on the original LX platform, derived from the Mercedes-Benz E-Class (W211). While the suspension was tweaked, the front suspension is still derived from the design of the Mercedes-Benz S-Class (W220) and the 5-link rear design from the Mercedes-Benz E-Class (W211).

Powertrain
The new 3.6 L Pentastar V6 engine replaced the 2.7 L V6 engine as well as the 3.5 L High Output V6 engine. The 3.6 L Pentastar has variable valve timing, which is a technology that adjusts the timing of the intake and/or exhaust valves. The engine uses a timing chain instead of a belt. The exhaust manifold is cast directly into the cylinder head.

The Charger was built alongside the 2011 Challenger SRT8 392 and Chrysler 300C. Engines are available with both the 5-speed and 8-speed automatic transmissions.

2012
From the 2012 model year, the 3.6 L engine was available with an 8-speed automatic that improved fuel economy by 4-mpg on the highway.

It is mechanically identical to the Chrysler 300 SRT-8.

Charger SRT8
The Charger SRT8 returned as 2012 model, which was previewed at the 2011 Chicago Auto Show. Chrysler began putting the Dodge logo with slanted red rectangles on the grilles of the SRT8 halfway through the 2012 model year.

Charger Super Bee
In 2011, it was announced that the Super Bee will be returning as a 2012 model on the redesigned Dodge Charger with the 392 HEMI engine in "Stinger Yellow" and "Pitch Black" exterior colors.

Charger Mopar Designs Edition

In 2011 Dodge introduced the Dodge Charger R/T Mopar 11 Edition. In the Mopar Edition, there are several appearance and performance changes to set it apart from the rest of the production models that year. The Mopar edition came only in the ”Pitch Black“ exterior color with a Mopar blue driver side stripe and a Mopar grille badge instead of an "R/T" badge. The interior is finished in the same black as seen on the outside except for a splash of chrome and carbon fiber dash and center console, along with a pistol grip shifter. The Mopar blue stripe is carried to the interior as a part of the driver's front seat and the left side rear passenger seat. The performance of the Mopar edition Charger is improved with the Super Track Pack, a 3.91 final drive gear ratio, a three-mode traction control, heavy-duty brakes, larger stability bars, front and rear strut tower bars, as well as a sport-tuned steering rack.

Recalls
9,688 2011 and 2012 Dodge Charger police vehicles were recalled for overheated lighting harness connector causing low beams to fail, and an overheated power distribution center could result in a loss of the vehicle's anti-lock braking and stability control systems.

On May 7, 2012, a recall announcement was made by the National Highway Traffic Safety Administration (NHTSA) regarding loss of anti-lock brakes and stability control as a result of an overheated fuse in the PDC. This failure could lead to loss of vehicle control, which increases crash risk. Over 127,350 Chrysler 300s and Dodge Chargers were recalled.

2013

2013 NASCAR Dodge Charger
Penske Racing built two Sprint Cup Series race cars based on the appearance of 2013 Dodge Charger, and the cars were unveiled in Las Vegas Motor Speedway. About the time the car was unveiled, Penske Racing, the sole Dodge team in Sprint Cup announced it was switching to Ford for the 2013 season. Although the new cars received positive reviews by the automotive press and in track testing, attempts by Dodge Motorsports to get other teams to switch to the new Charger for 2013 came to naught, and Dodge folded its NASCAR racing efforts in all series except the NASCAR Pinty's Series, which is dominated by Dodge cars.

Dodge Charger Juiced

2013 Dodge Charger R/T Blacktop
Available for the Charger R/T and R/T Plus, it includes a choice of 6 body colors (Pitch Black, Billet Metallic, Granite Crystal, Bright White, Redline Red Tri-coat, and Phantom Black Tri-coat), Gloss Black 20-inch aluminum wheels, Gloss Black center caps, Gloss Black front grille, body-color rear spoiler, steering wheel-mounted paddle shifters, Sport Mode, 3.06 rear axle, Beats Audio (10 speakers with subwoofer and 552-Watt amplifier).
The Blacktop Package was also available in model years 2012 and 2013 for the Charger V6 model. Horsepower was increased to 300 through the use of cold air intake and less restrictive exhaust systems.

2013 Dodge Charger Daytona

The Charger Daytona is a limited version of the 2013 Charger R/T and Charger R/T Road & Track with a choice of 4 body colors (Daytona Blue, Bright White, Billet Silver, Pitch Black), dark trim, Satin Black front crosshair grille with heritage "R/T" badge, custom vinyl hood graphic, roof wrap, rear R/T spoiler; "DAYTONA" graphic on the rear quarter panels, exclusive 20-inch five-spoke polished aluminum wheels with Gloss Black painted pockets, 'Daytona Blue' engine cover, performance 3.06 rear axle ratio, high-speed engine controller, paddle shifters with sport mode, performance steering and suspension, black heated and ventilated seats with Daytona Blue stitching and piping in cloth (R/T) or Nappa leather and suede (R/T Road & Track) upholstery, blue "DAYTONA" embroidery at the upper front seat backs, unique dark brushed aluminum trim surrounds the 8.4-inch Uconnect Touch screen and gauges on the instrument panel, as well as the trim around the shifter and cup holders on the center console; a Mopar bright pedal kit, a 552-watt 10-speaker Beats Audio System, a special numbered "DAYTONA" badge on the instrument panel that features the build number of that specific Charger Daytona model.

The SRT Daytona was unveiled at the 2012 Los Angeles International Auto Show. US models arrived at Dodge dealerships nationwide in the first quarter of 2013. Production was limited to 2,500 units.

2013 Dodge Charger AWD Sport
Available for Dodge Charger SXT AWD, SXT Plus AWD, Charger R/T AWD, and R/T Plus AWD, the Charger AWD Sport package includes a unique gloss black painted split-crosshair grille and grille surround, 19-inch polished aluminum wheels with Gloss Black pockets, all-season performance tires, steering-wheel-mounted paddle shifters, sport mode transmission calibration, rear body-color spoiler, sport seats in black cloth (SXT and R/T) or premium black or red heated Nappa leather (SXT Plus and R/T Plus) upholstery, Beats Audio technology (a 12-channel amplifier integrating Beats proprietary equalizer algorithm, three 3.5-inch speakers located in the instrument panel, two 3.5-inch speakers located in the rear doors, two 6 x 9-inch front-door woofers, two 6 x 9-inch speakers and a center-mounted 8-inch speaker located in the rear-shelf area), active transfer case and front-axle-disconnect system.

The US model arrived at Dodge dealerships nationwide in the first quarter of 2013.

Dodge Charger SRT8 392 Appearance Package
Available for the 2013 and 2014 model years, this appearance package is a limited (392 units total) version of Dodge Charger SRT8 with custom-designed gloss black "392 HEMI" fender badges with a charcoal grey metallic insert, center section of power bulge hood painted in Pitch Black, roof painted in Pitch Black, new satin black SRT lower-body side stripe with a heavy band and accent tracer stretching from the front fascia, through doors to rear fascias; side mirrors painted in Pitch Black, 20-inch split five-spoke Black Vapor Chrome wheels, rear spoiler painted in Pitch Black, choice of 5 body colors (Bright White Clear Coat, Billet Silver Metallic Clear Coat, Plum Crazy Pearl Coat, HEMI Orange Pearl Coat, and TorRed Clear Coat), '392' engine beauty covers under the hood, exclusive serialized dash plaque showing production build number / 392, expanded adaptive damping suspension with three-mode selectable suspension tuning, standard launch control.

Orders for the US model began in April 2013.

2014

2014 Dodge Charger, Dodge Charger AWD Sport
Changes for 2014 included Uconnect 8.4N with integrated Garmin navigation, 3 new body colors (Header Orange, TorRed, Plum Crazy), and re-introduction of the Blacktop and Rallye Appearance Packages.

The Redline package is based on 2014 Dodge Charger SXT and SXT Plus models, with 20-inch Black Chrome wheels with a Redline Red lip and inner backbone, all-season performance tires, a performance-tuned suspension, sport seats, rear body-color spoiler, exclusive Beats by Dre audio system, eight-speed automatic transmission with steering-wheel-mounted paddle shifters and Sport Mode.

The 20-inch Wheel Sport Appearance Group is based on Charger SXT models, with 20-inch chrome-clad wheels, performance-tuned suspension and all-season tires, and a body-color rear spoiler.

The Dodge Charger AWD Sport includes a unique Gloss Black split-crosshair grille, polished 19-inch aluminum wheels with Gloss Black pockets; steering-wheel-mounted paddle shifters with sport-mode, rear spoiler, sport seats, 300 horsepower V-6 or 370 horsepower V8 engine, Beats Audio.

The US model was set to appear in Dodge showrooms in fall 2013. Early models include SE, SXT, SXT Plus, R/T, R/T Plus, R/T Road & Track, R/T Max.

2014 Dodge Charger Pursuit, Charger Pursuit V-8 AWD
The police version of the Dodge Charger was made available with a choice of a 3.6-liter Pentastar V6 (292 hp) or 5.7-liter HEMI V8 (370 hp) engine, larger 14.5-inch front brake discs, increased front-caliper swept area from 289 sq.in to 388 sq.in., increased rear-caliper swept area from 291 sq.in. to 296 sq.in., Police-specific Secure Park (prevents an idling vehicle from being driven without key fob present in the vehicle), revised rear fascia and exhaust tips, new camber link change to the rear suspension to further enhance high-speed and aggressive braking performance, upgraded fuel pump for added durability, variable-displacement air conditioner compressor for added efficiency, factory-installed Mopar horizontal or vertical vinyl graphics for customer convenience and optional ParkSense rear-park assist.

The Charger Pursuit V-8 AWD model includes segment-exclusive active transfer case and front-axle disconnect (late availability). The Dodge Charger Pursuit AWD became available to law enforcement customers in the Spring of 2014 through Chrysler Group's Fleet Operations.

2014 Dodge Charger Scat Packages, 2013 SEMA concept
Unveiled at the 2013 SEMA Show, the Scat Package 1 includes a Mopar cold air intake, Mopar cat-back exhaust, Scat Package 1 badge, and an all-new performance calibrated engine controller "optimized" to the 5.7-liter HEMI engine.

The Scat Package 2 adds a customized, optimized performance calibration feature tailored for Scat Package 2, a new Mopar performance camshaft that works in conjunction with the components of the Scat Package 1 kit, and a 'Scat Package 2' badge.

The Scat Package 3 adds optimized performance calibration tailored for Scat Package 3, new Mopar performance CNC ported and polished cylinder heads, Mopar performance camshaft, Mopar hi-flow performance headers, and a Scat Package 3 badge.

The SEMA concept car includes 20 x 9-inch unique lightweight wheels with black Mopar center caps and a Hyperblack II finish, a side valence, a unique new front splitter and Redline rear spoiler, a Scat Pack hard badge in the rear quarter window, Katzkin black performance leather seats, black leather door panel inserts featuring red leather Dodge stripes and red accent stitching, red seat-belt webbing, red carpet bindings, red embroidered Dodge Charger logo in the front seats, gloss-black steering-wheel spokes, black chrome on the door handles, cluster rings, instrument panel bezels, center console trim, and steering-wheel center ring; added bright pedal kit, pistol-grip shifter, door-sill guards, and a wireless charging pad.

Dodge Charger 100th Anniversary Edition

The 100th Anniversary Edition is a version of the 2014 Dodge Charger SXT Plus with the Pentastar V6 engine or R/T Plus with HEMI V-8 engine, commemorating the 100th anniversary of brothers Horace Elgin Dodge and John Francis Dodge introducing the Dodge Model 30, with choice of 8 body colors (Pitch Black, Bright White, Billet Silver, Granite Crystal, Ivory Tri-Coat, Phantom Black Tri-Coat, Header Orange and an exclusive High Octane Red pearl), 20x8-inch polished five-spoke aluminum wheels, Granite Crystal pockets and a matching Granite Crystal Dodge split-crosshair grille, "Dodge Est. 1914" bar-style front-fender badges, Dodge "100" logo on the center caps, a body-color rear spoiler, a red "R/T" heritage grille badge on R/T Plus model, sport seats with all-new Molten Red or Foundry Black Nappa leather upholstery, a custom cloud overprint at sport seats, center console armrest and door armrests; a unique three-spoke flat-bottom performance steering wheel with die-cast paddle shifters, brass-colored accent stitching on leather-wrapped surfaces, Dark Brushed Graphite center console bezels, Liquid Graphite steering-wheel accents, die-cast "Dodge Est. 1914" circular badges on front seatbacks, an embroidered anniversary logo on floor mats, all-new instrument panel cluster graphics (unique black-face gauges with white indication, stand-out red "100" mph indication), Electronic Vehicle Information Center and a Uconnect 8.4-inch touchscreen with unique startup image, Uconnect 8.4-inch touchscreen with Beats by Dr. Dre audio technology (10-speakers and a 12-channel 552 watt amplifier that integrates Beats proprietary equalizer algorithm), eight-speed automatic transmission with sport mode (SXT Plus), sport mode calibration, performance-tuned suspension, two unique key fobs with 100th Anniversary Edition jeweled logo on the back side, a customized owner's kit, a special commemorative book celebrating the 100 years of Dodge heritage.

The 100th Anniversary Edition was unveiled in the 2013 LA Auto Show. The vehicle was set to appear in Dodge showrooms during the first quarter of 2014. The Canadian model was set to appear in Dodge showrooms during the first quarter of 2014.

Motorsport
The 2014 Dodge Charger Pursuit AWD recorded the fastest lap time during Michigan State Police's 2014 Vehicle Evaluation Test (1:33.85), and fastest average lap time (1:34.75) at the Grattan Raceway.

Marketing
As part of the 2014 Dodge Charger launch in the US, Dodge Chargers appeared as hero vehicles driven by the main character Nolan (Grant Bowler) in a 2013 episode of US television series Defiance. The co-branded TV commercial, titled 'Dodge Charger | Defiance' debuted on May 20, 2013. The 30-second commercial shows the endurance of the Charger as it survives obstacles in a changing world, ending with a transformed planet Earth in the year 2046 where 'only the defiant survive.' In addition, the Dodge Defiance Arkfall Sweepstakes featured fans of Dodge and Defiance competing against each other, vying for the grand prize of a trip for two to the world's largest pop culture event taking place in California in summer 2013. Weekly prizes were awarded, including gaming systems, the “Defiance” video game, and Dodge brand merchandise.

2015 facelift

Unveiled at the 2014 New York International Auto Show, the 2015 Dodge Charger received a substantial makeover, the most noticeable change coming in the new front grille and rounded LED headlights. Retaining its Coke bottle styling Dodge claims to have reworked just about every panel on the car; made to look "leaner and more athletic" than its previous look while keeping the same dimensions. Dodge is reported to have used the 1969 Charger as its inspiration for the remodeling.

The engines include the  5.7 L Hemi V8 and the  3.6 liter V6. The V6 model is EPA-rated at 31 mpg or 7.6L/100 km which is claimed by the manufacturer to be the best in its class. Except for the Police Pursuit version (which retains the 5 speed automatic), the only available transmission is the Chrysler eight-speed automatic, coupled with optional all-wheel drive. The all-wheel-drive system automatically removes power to the front axle when not required, giving an improvement in fuel economy. The new electronic gearshift with optional paddle shifters gives shift times of as little as 0.25 seconds in the sport mode.

The reworked interior includes new materials for the door, console, and dash panels, a new steering wheel and seats, and a wide range of trim packages with both leather and cloth seating. The refreshed interior also features a new instrument cluster featuring a 7-inch (180mm) TFT (Thin Film Transistor) display. The available 8.4-inch Uconnect touchscreen radio with available navigation has been revised, now including Uconnect Apps. Mechanically, the 3.6L Pentastar V6 and the 5.7L/6.4L HEMI engines remained the same. All engines are now backed by the ZF 8HP 8-Speed Automatic transmissions co-produced by ZF (previously only V6 models used the ZF 8-speed). There have been revisions to the chassis components, including Electric-Assist power steering, which replaces the previous models Electro-Hydraulic Assist power steering. New aluminum rear differentials now use 4-mounting bolts for rigidity. AWD is no longer available on 5.7L R/T models.

The 2015 Dodge Charger went on sale starting December 2014 in the US and Canada.

Charger SRT Hellcat

The 2015 Dodge Charger SRT Hellcat was introduced on August 13, 2014, prior to being shown at the Woodward Dream Cruise and was unveiled at the 2014 South Florida International Auto Show in November. 

The Charger Hellcat features a redesigned front fascia with a larger lower grille similar to the current generation Dodge Viper.

The Hellcat is claimed to be the fastest factory four-door sedan ever built.

Performance

Charger SRT 392
The Charger SRT 392 also comes with 20-inch forged aluminum wheels, 15.4-inch brake rotors out front, and 13.8-inch rear brake rotors.

Charger R/T Scat Pack
The Charger R/T Scat Pack essentially takes the place of the former SRT8 Super Bee in the Charger lineup. The powertrain of the SRT 392 is present, as are the front and rear bumpers, but leather upholstery is optional (as opposed to standard), the suspension uses fixed-rate Bilstein shocks, the brakes are slightly smaller, and the wheel and tire package is narrower. The Scat pack shares its exterior look with the Charger Hellcat and features a narrow grille, a hood scoop, tinted headlamps, and 20-inch forged wheels.

2020

Charger Widebody
For 2020, a "Widebody Package" was made available for the Charger R/T Scat Pack as an option, but replacing the narrow-body Charger Hellcat. The package mirrors that of the Challenger Widebody. The following are included:
 Widebody fender flares
 20x11-inch Devils Rim forged aluminum wheels
 305/35ZR20 Pirelli 3-season performance tires
 3-mode Bilstein adaptive damping suspension uniquely tuned for competition use
 6-piston calipers with 15.4-inch vented and slotted rotors in the front (standard on Hellcat models)
 Stiffened anti-roll bars sized 34mm in front and 22mm rear (standard on Hellcat models)
 New electrically assisted steering system
 Features from the Challenger Demon including race cool down (Hellcat only), line lock and launch control/launch assist

2021

Charger SRT Hellcat Redeye
A heavily upgraded version of the Hellcat was introduced as the Hellcat Redeye for 2021. Other upgrades include reinforced ZF 8 speed automatic transmission, track-tuned suspension, torque reserve and 41-spline heavy-duty half-shafts, SRT power chiller, and after-run chiller.

Safety
The 2022 Charger was tested by the Insurance Institute for Highway Safety (IIHS):

Police package/Charger Pursuit

In early 2006, DaimlerChrysler released a new police version of the Charger. It made its debut at the 2005 New York International Auto Show. Unlike the civilian version, the police version features upgraded heavy-duty brakes, a severe-duty cooling system, police-performance Electronic Stability Program, police performance-tuned steering, and a gear shifter that is mounted on the steering column instead of in the center console.

The Charger is in use with many American, Canadian, and Mexican police organizations.

In Michigan State Police testing, the Charger V8 outperformed all other pursuit vehicles in acceleration, cornering, and braking (except the Dodge Magnum and V6 Charger, which stopped slightly faster in some tests) in the first five years since its introduction.

The Charger is in use with numerous police agencies in North America as both a marked and an unmarked patrol car. Law enforcement agencies outside of the U.S. have also purchased the Charger, including police services in Canada, Mexico, Chile, the Czech Republic, and the Middle East, including Bahrain, Kuwait, Lebanon, Saudi Arabia, and the United Arab Emirates. Both V6 and V8 models are used by the Police forces, with highway patrols favoring the  Hemi. The Charger is also in service with the U.S. federal government and in its military police services.

For 2009, the base Charger police car came with the 3.5L V6 and a 5-speed automatic transmission. The rear is slightly updated, moving the "CHARGER" badge to the right, and replacing the left with the badge reading "DODGE."

When the Charger was redesigned for the 2011 model year, the police package version was renamed Dodge Charger Pursuit. Through mid-2014, there was a 3.6 RWD model, and a V8-RWD model.
In mid-2014, A V8-AWD model became optional, along with a BR9 brake package. In 2012, the Dodge Charger Pursuit replaced the Ford Crown Victoria as the #1 police sedan in North America following the latter's discontinuation. For the 2015 model year, the Dodge Charger Pursuit also received a facelift like its retail version. By 2017, the Charger Pursuit and Explorer Interceptor essentially shared the sales award, as sales of the ultra-high-performance AWD Charger rapidly increased.
In 2020, in part because of limited A580 transmission availability, the entire factory allotment of Charger Pursuits sold out in only a few months' time. Only two models were available in 2020, the RWD 3.6L and the V8-AWD model.

For 2021, after a long production break on account of COVID-19, the Charger Pursuit resumed production in late 2020 with two models: a new V6-AWD (850RE transmission), and a V8-RWD (8HP70). Besides the adaptation of the 8-spd autos, Chrysler tamed down the hot rod Dodges a bit, by instituting electronically limited top speeds of 140 mph on both models, down about a dozen on the V8 cars. Agencies now have the ability to configure the cars downward from 140 mph to a speed of their choosing.

While some officers may feel the new limit is too slow, the only pursuit-rated vehicle currently on the market that exceeds 140 mph is the costlier turbo Ford Police Interceptor Utility.

Chrysler will continue to produce the LD Charger/Chrysler 300 and the LA Challenger through 2023 at Brampton Assembly, with all-new replacements expected in 2024. These cars are expected to have new powerplants, including hybrid models, and electrics. Dodge is promising performance that exceeds that of today's cars. Fleet managers will continue to have pursuit-rated sedan from Stellantis.

Production
The Dodge Charger is assembled at the Brampton plant in Brampton, Ontario, Canada. The Charger shared the LX platform with the Chrysler 300, the newer fourth generation Dodge Challenger, and the discontinued Dodge Magnum.

Total sales

References

External links

Dodge Charger, official website
2006–10 Dodge Charger, Allpar
Dodge Charger Pursuit page

Charger
2010s cars
2020s cars
Cars introduced in 2005
All-wheel-drive vehicles
Full-size vehicles
Rear-wheel-drive vehicles
Sports sedans
Police vehicles